Jamz is a village in Montazeriyeh Rural District, in the Central District of Tabas County, South Khorasan Province, Iran. At the 2006 census, its population was 525, in 138 families.

References 

Populated places in Tabas County